Premium Plaza is the largest residential flats building in Zambia owned by the Zambia States Insurance Corporation (ZSIC). With 10 floors above the ground, the building is situated in Kansenshi, Ndola at the corner of Kwacha and Chela roads. The ground floor is a shopping complex with assorted shops and offices.

References

External links
 http://www.zsic.co.zm/

Residential buildings in Zambia

Ndola